Sakhir Air Base  is a public-use airport located 3 nautical miles (5.5 km) south-southwest of Awali, Bahrain.

The airbase itself was built for the Bahrain International Airshow, held every two years in January. Jets come from multiple countries such as Russia, Saudi Arabia, Qatar, United Arab Emirates, India, and many others to show off to the local community. The airport is also used by VIP visitors, foreign top government officials, visiting heads of states and the king of Bahrain himself.

See also
List of airports in Bahrain

References

External links 
 Airport record for Sakhir Air Base at Landings.com

Airports in Bahrain